Václav Trégl (10 December 1902 – 11 February 1979) was a Czechoslovak film actor. He appeared in more than 120 films between 1933 and 1977.

Selected filmography
 The Inspector General (1933)
 Workers, Let's Go (1934)
 Poslední muž (1934)
 The Little Pet (1934)
 Hrdina jedné noci (1935)
 Jedenácté přikázání (1935)
 Long Live with Dearly Departed (1935)
 The Seamstress (1936)
 Father Vojtech (1936)
 Andula Won (1937)
 Krok do tmy (1937)
 Lawyer Vera (1937)
 Ducháček Will Fix It (1938)
 Škola základ života (1938)
 U pokladny stál... (1939)
 Baron Prášil (1940)
 Arthur and Leontine (1940)
 Barbora Hlavsová (1942)
 The Emperor and the Golem (1951)
 The Fabulous World of Jules Verne (1958)
 The Fabulous Baron Munchausen (1961)

References

External links
 

1902 births
1979 deaths
Czech male film actors
People from Bělá pod Bezdězem
20th-century Czech male actors